Wilmington Grammar School for Boys (WGSB) is a grammar school with academy status in Wilmington, Kent.

From 1954 to 1982, the school was called Dartford Technical High School. Today it is a specialist engineering school with a strong emphasis on design technology, mathematics and physics.

The uniform consists of navy blue blazers, white shirts, grey or black trousers and different ties for each house within the school.. Suits are worn in the sixth form. The school is situated directly alongside Wilmington Academy and has multiple bus services that also serve Dartford Grammar School for Girls, Dartford Grammar School, Wilmington Grammar School for Girls and Wilmington Academy.

Departments
The school has the following departments: Science, Mathematics, Design & Technology, Business and Economics, Geography, History/Government and Politics, English, Art, Modern Languages (including German, French and Spanish), Media, Information Communication Technology, Religious Education, PE and Music. The school no longer teaches Drama.

Houses
There are 6 different houses in WGSB:
 Brunel, (Dark Blue, Yellow, Light Blue and a Purple Stripe)
 Darwin, (Dark Blue, Yellow, Light Blue and a White Stripe)
 Newton, (Dark Blue, Yellow, Light Blue and a Black Stripe)
 Stevenson, (Dark blue, Yellow, Light Blue and a Green Stripe)
 Telford, (Dark Blue, Yellow, Light Blue and a Red Stripe)
 Hawking (from 2020), (Dark Blue, Yellow, Light Blue and a Yellow Stripe)

Notable pupils

 Paul Carr, writer, journalist and commentator
 Ben Thompson, footballer who plays as a midfielder for Millwall F.C
 Ben Sheaf, footballer who plays as a midfielder for Arsenal
 Mackenzie Crook, actor (The Office, Pirates of the Caribbean: The Curse of the Black Pearl)
 Neal Hazel, criminologist and former Her Majesty's Deputy Chief Inspector of Probation for England and Wales
 Keith Richards, musician, The Rolling Stones
 Michael Swanton, an authority on Old English literature and the Anglo-Saxon period
 Nick Lee, cricketer
 Yusuf Mersin footballer who plays as a goalkeeper for Dover Athletic

F1 in Schools
The technology department at WGSB competes in an international competition called F1 in Schools which is where students form a team of 3–6 students and then design and build a car made from a block of balsa wood (More details on F1 in Schools page). The school has taken part in this competition since the 2007–2008 season, with numerous successes.

The team Redshift succeeded the 2014 London & South-East England Regional Final and then came 3rd in the 2013 National Final at the ExCel Arena, London. This earned them the opportunity to become a collaboration team, meaning that they joined another team from around the globe – which was a team from Singapore. The team renamed from Redshift to X-Shift, a merging of both teams' names, since the Singapore team were called Team X-Treme. This meant that they took part in the 2013 World Finals held in Austin, Texas.

Another team called Turbocharged had taken part in the Bloodhound SSC class, which is the same as the F1 class but it is designing a car based around the Bloodhound SSC. The team succeeded the regional final in the 2012–13 season, and then won the national final, meaning that they were national champions and gained a new world-record time for their car racing down the track (this record was 0.587 seconds). In the 2013–14 season, the team entered again into the competition and were unsuccessful, but after lodging a complaint about other teams being illegal, meant they were able to move to the national finals as a wildcard. The team then proudly attended the national final and won it again, meaning that they are the only team that has ever become national champions twice.

For the 2015 Bloodhound SSC Class, a new team was formed called Vortex. The team consisted of three old members of Turbocharged, and a new member. Vortex did not succeed in the regionals, but were selected as a wildcard to progress to the nationals. They had the fastest time, but this was considerably slower than previous years, as the rules had changed, forcing the 8-gram car up to 30 grams. The team used the same principle of golf balls to create a turbulent boundary layer, to increase the speed of the car. The team won the national finals.

See also
 Wilmington Grammar School for Girls

Notes and references

External links

 
 Wilmington Grammar Sixth Form
 Old Dartechs' & Wilmingtonians' Association Archives
 Inspection report

Boys' schools in Kent
Grammar schools in Kent
Borough of Dartford
Educational institutions established in 1954
1954 establishments in England
Academies in Kent

Specialist engineering colleges in England